Antoni Rajkiewicz (Poland, 11 June 1922 – 24 July 2021) was a Polish academic and politician.

References

1922 births
2021 deaths
Polish politicians
Polish Workers' Party politicians
Polish United Workers' Party members
University of Łódź alumni
SGH Warsaw School of Economics alumni
Academic staff of the University of Warsaw
People from Łódź Voivodeship (1919–1939)
Recipients of the Order of Polonia Restituta
Recipients of the Order of the Banner of Work
Recipients of the Silver Cross of Merit (Poland)